Evander is a town in Mpumalanga, South Africa. It is approximately 8 km north west of Secunda.

History
The town was founded in 1955 when the Union Corporation started its mining activities and was originally part of the Bethal district (named after a town 36 km to the east). The town is named after Evelyn Anderson, the wife of Peter Maltitz Anderson, one of the directors of the corporation.

Economy

Gold mining 
The Union Corporation acquired options in the Kinross area, 64 km east of Springs. Mining started in 1955 though their subsidiary Winkelhaak Mines Ltd.
The Evander mine is currently operating in its 9th shaft and employs around 3,300 people. These operations, now owned by Harmony Gold, mine the Kimberley Reef in the Evander Basin and produced over 16 000 kg of gold from 2008 to 2010. The ore is milled and processed at Kinross, 7 km north.

Education
The town has a 5 primary schools (Emdibini, Hoëveld, Isikhumbuzo, Inqanawe, and T P Stratten), a high school (Evander High School) and hosts one of the four campuses of the Gert Sibande College (originally the Evander Technical Institute).

Infrastructure

Airports
The Evander airfield is located just south-west of the town.

References

Populated places in the Govan Mbeki Local Municipality
Mining communities in South Africa